The sport of rugby league football has accrued a considerable amount of jargon to describe aspects of the game. Many terms originate from the Laws of the Game. A number of aspects of the game have more than one term that refers to them. Different terms have become popularly used to describe an aspect of the game in different places with notable differences between the northern and southern hemispheres.

Where words in a sentence are also defined elsewhere in this glossary, they appear in italics.

0–9

 Every time a player is tackled, all defenders, apart from a maximum of two markers, have to retreat 10 metres from the play-the-ball area.

 A player selected as a back-up to the official 17 man squad for a game. The 18th man usually warms up with the team prior to a match and may be called into the team if one of the 17 players is injured or ill prior to the start of the match. The term is also sometimes used informally to refer to a team's supporters, and the squad number 18 may even be reserved for this purpose.

 If a player standing no more than 40 metres away from his own try line manages to a kick a ball in general play which bounces in the field of play then goes into touch inside his opponents, 20-metre area, his side restart the game with a tap 20m from the touchline and level with where the ball went out of play but no closer than 10m to the defending team's goal line.

A

 The defender in the defensive line that is immediately to the right or left of the play-the-ball.

 One determinant of a dangerous tackle. Defenders lifting an attacking player off the ground to the point when their feet are higher than their head. Lifting a player this way can be a precursor to the outlawed spear tackle.

 "Advantage" is the period of time after an infringement, in which the non-offending side have the opportunity to gain sufficient territory or tactical opportunity to negate the need to stop the game due to the infringement. The referee will signal advantage with their arm out horizontally, toward the non-infringing team. If no tactical or territorial advantage is gained, the referee will whistle, and give the decision that had been delayed. If sufficient advantage is gained, the referee will call "advantage over", and play will continue. The Advantage Law allows the game to flow more freely, and not stop for every minor infringement.

 It is an imaginary line across the pitch when there is a breakdown in open play, i.e. a play-the-ball, scrum. Advancing across the advantage line represents a gain in territory. Also called the "gain line".

 An ankle tap, also referred to as a tap-tackle, may be used as a last resort by a defender chasing the attacking player carrying the ball if that player is about to evade them and a conventional tackle is not possible. If the defender is not able to get close enough to the ball-carrier to wrap their arms around them in a conventional tackle, they may still be able to dive at the other player's feet and, with outstretched arm, deliver a tap or hook to the player's foot (or feet) causing the player to stumble. At speed, this will often be sufficient to bring the ball-carrier down and may sufficiently delay the attacker for a defender to complete the tackle or for the defending team to organise their defence.

 When an attacking player makes an off the ball run that goes in the opposite direction of the attack. If the attacking side are passing the ball to the left edge the runner against the grain is running back into the middle of the pitch. 

 See Round the corner kicking

B

 A type of tackle  preventing the player (who is being tackled) being able to offload the ball to a team mate, who might, before the tackle has been completed, carry on the attack. This type of tackle involves preventing the player being tackled from being able to move their arms effectively.

 The player in possession of the ball.

 An instance in which a tackle can be judged to be complete is when the attacking player's ball-carrying arm is touching the ground at the same time that a defending player is in contact with the attacker.

If the ball enters touch, then play is restarted by a scrum at the point where the ball left the field of play. The exception is when the ball is kicked into touch without first bouncing inside the field of play (on the full). In this case, the scrum is taken from level with the place from where the ball was kicked from. The ball is given back to the team who did not kick it out of bounds; ball back is waived in certain circumstances:
 If a side elects to kick a penalty into touch

 A medium-range kick performed in general play that goes to off to the side of the kicker rather than in front, for chasers further afield. The aim of the banana kick is to be less predictable than conventional kicks and is named such thus as the rise and fall of the ball is in a curve like that of a banana.

 Fighting.

 The ball carrier takes a strong carry by putting the defenders on the back foot and therefore bending the defensive line.

 The underside of the crossbar connecting the goal posts will have a marking on it in the centre, usually black in colour, that is referred to as the "black dot". The black dot can be used as an aid to kickers with their aiming. A player scoring a try in the centre of the goal line or in goal, that is beneath the posts, might be said to have scored "under the black dot".

 The narrow side of the pitch in relation to a scrum or a play the ball; the opposite of openside.

 See: Interchange

 See: Bomb (kick)

 A breach of the line of defenders by the player in possession of the ball on the attacking team.

 Bridging refers to a team linking or binding players together at the play-the-ball into a scrum-like formation.

 Broken-time payments compensated players for the time they missed from work due to their rugby playing commitments. The use of these payments was one of the issues that led to the schism of rugby football in England. Broken-time payments were the original player payment system of the Northern Rugby Football Union in 1895.

 A bust, or tackle bust, is when a player breaks through an attempted tackle.

 When the ball carrier runs into contact and uses their forearms to initiate contact with the defenders, protecting the ball in the process.

C

 A dangerous tackle in which a defender attacks the legs of a stationary, standing player who is being held upright by other tacklers.

 See: team warning

 The centres, or 'centre three-quarters', (numbered 4 and 5) are positioned one in from the wings and together complete what is known as the three-quarter line. They are divided into left and right centres.
 Usually the best mixture of power and vision, their main role is to try to create attacking opportunities for their team and defend those of the opposition. Along with the wingers, the centres score plenty of tries throughout a season.

 Another term for handover.

 The blocking of an attacker's kick as it rises from the foot. Done with outstretched arms and hands, this is not a knock-on.

 

 A shoulder lock wrestling technique, often used to slow down the play-the-ball, that places "undue pressure" on joints of players. It is punishable under Section 15, Law 1 (i) of the Laws of the Game as it is deemed "contrary to the true spirit of the game".

 A feature of the  Super League play-offs between 2009 and 2014 in which the highest ranked team from the regular season table to win their match in the first week of the play-offs was able to select their opponents for their next game, a qualifying semi-final in week three, from the teams that won their preliminary semi-final in week two.

 The percentage of times in possession that a team holds the ball for a full set of six tackles.

 
 If a team scores a try, they have an opportunity to "convert" it for two further points by kicking the ball between the posts and above the crossbar - that is, through the goal. The kick is taken at any point on the field of play in line with the point that the ball was grounded for the try parallel to the touch-lines. So it is advantageous to score a try nearer to the posts as it is easier to convert it.
 The kick can be either a drop kick or a place kick.

 The attempt to tackle an attacker who has breached the main line of defenders.

 Another name for the crash ball.

 A dangerous tackle in which a grounded player's chin is forced down towards his torso.

 Sometimes referred to as a "cut out ball", "face ball", or "face pass", the ball is passed by an attacking player across the front of one of their team mates and caught by a team mate positioned further away. This pass may be used to move the ball more speedily away from defenders who are closing in and likely to be focussing on the player who is "cut out".

D

 The ball is deemed to be dead if it goes out of play beyond the dead ball line.

 A boundary located at each end of the playing field. The dead ball line is out of play.

 A penalty that may not be kicked for goal by the team to which it is awarded. This kind of penalty is awarded when technical rule breaches (i.e. not foul play or obscene language) are committed during the time a scrum exists. A differential penalty can be award against any player, whether in the scrum or outside.  In 2023 the RFL modified the rule to make penalties for scrum offences non-differential.

 A referee may call "Dominant!" as a player is tackled to indicate the dominance of the defender over the attacking player in possession during the contact between them at the tackle. A dominant tackle is judged to be when the defender makes contact and drives the attacker back in one movement. The dominant tackle call rewards good technique and allows the defender extra time before the attacker must be released to be allowed to play-the-ball.

 A hand-off that results in the defender getting floored and the attacker continuing their run.

 An illegal movement in the attempt to score a try. An attacking player whose momentum does not allow the ball to reach the try-line or in-goal after their ball-carrying arm touches the ground may not reach out to score if a defender is in contact with them; this is disallowed by interpretation as a "double movement".

 Downward pressure is one of the several criteria that needs to be met for a  try to be awarded by the referee.

 An offensive ruse, where the ball carrier moves as if to pass the ball to a team-mate, but then continues to run with the ball himself; the objective is to trick defenders into marking the would-be pass receiver, creating a gap for the ball carrier to run into.

 Another offensive tactic; a player on the attacking team runs towards the opposition as if running onto a pass, only for the ball to be passed to another player, carried on by the ball carrier or kicked forwards. As with a dummy pass, this tactic draws defenders away from the ball and creates space for the attacking team. Also called a "decoy runner".

E

 The ball carrier is trying to get a quick play of the ball and to do so will aim to land on their 'elbows and knees' meaning they can stand up quicker.

F

 See: Cut out pass A defending player in contact with the ball-carrier during or after the completion of a tackle aggressively and illegally touching the face of the ball-carrier with their hand or forearm. There may be different motivations for this action, such as wanting to provoke a reaction from the ball-carrier in order to gain a penalty, attempting to establish dominance over their opponent, or as a symptom of frustration.

An instance of the ball coming into contact with a person's head, almost always unintentionally.

 See: Loose head and feed To roll the ball into the scrum.
 Technically, the ball should enter the scrum via the tunnel formed by the front row forwards of the two teams binding together, with both teams able to strike for the ball, but a relaxed application of the rule is practised. The relaxed application allows players to roll the ball more directly into their team's side of the scrum thus reducing the chances of the other team successfully striking for the ball and gaining possession of it.
 "Feeding!" is an ironic accusation sometimes called out by spectators of a game in response to a player taking advantage of the modern application of the rule.

 Fending is the action by the ball carrier of repelling a tackler using his arm, also known as a "hand off". For the action to be legal, the ball carrier's arm must be straight before contact is made; a shove or "straight-arm smash", where the arm is extended immediately before contact or on contact, is illegal and classed as dangerous play.

 The first man to receive the ball off the ruck, i.e. from the dummy-half.

 See: Stand-off.

 A style of attacking play characterised by a lack of depth along the line of attacking players. More of the attacking team are in close proximity to defenders. The attackers look to take advantage of weaknesses created if defenders cannot organise themselves and allocate defenders to where they are needed. Weaknesses of this style of play include risk of passes being intercepted and a lack of speed in the attacking line.

 This type of pass involves the player in possession of the ball and a team mate being level when the pass is received. The player about to receive the ball may be running past the ball-carrier aiming for a gap in the defence; with this there is a risk of committing a forward pass if the players get their timing wrong.

 An attempt by a player not involved in the completion of a tackle to delay the player in possession from getting to their feet quickly afterwards by falling on top of those involved. The referee can award a penalty to the attacking team when he sees this tactic.

 A non-technical breach of the rules such as a high tackle.

 The four-tackle rule was in force between 1966 and 1972. The rule ended the situation, a by-product from the introduction of the play-the-ball in 1906, whereby teams could have a potentially unlimited number of tackles.Bottom ten: Rugby league rules, Rugby League World, Aug 2009: 62 The tackle limit was raised from four to six tackles in 1972 to alleviate "disjointed" play.

 The title of full back (numbered 1) comes from the full back's defensive position where the player drops out of the defensive line to cover the rear from kicks and runners breaking the line. They therefore usually are good ball catchers and clinical tacklers. In attack the full back will typically make runs into the attack or support a runner in anticipation of a pass out of the tackle.

G

 See Advantage line "Ger 'em onside", or "gerrumonside", is a corruption of "get them onside" shouted to match officials in some northern England accents. The term is used predominantly to express dissatisfaction with the distance back from the play-the-ball that the referee has taken the defending players.

 In competitions under some authorities, the referee will call "Go" to tell the defensive line that they may advance after an attacker has played the ball. This call is intended to reduce stoppages to deal with offside offences by defenders. This call may be used by the referee as part of a sequence: hold, go".

When the game is tight and both sides are just trying to complete their sets and gain field position a team will try win the grind.

 Two solid, straight white lines (one at each end) stretching across the entire width of the pitch passing directly through the goal posts which defines the boundary between the field of play and the in-goal. As the goal line is defined as part of the in-goal, attacking players can score tries by placing the ball with downward pressure onto the goal line itself. The base of the goal posts and post protectors are also defined to be part of the goal line.
 The goal line is often referred to as the "try line" though that term does not appear in the Laws of the Game.

 Awarded when a defending player grounds the ball in his own in-goal area, is tackled with the ball in his own in-goal area, or when a defending player plays the ball dead (or into touch) behind his own goal line. The defending team must kick the ball from their own goal line and beneath the uprights to a minimum distance of ten metres.

 Change in running style from a sprint to high kicking in order to slow down a defender only to sprint once defender has slowed down.

 See: 1895 Schism The act of placing the ball down correctly over the try line in order to score a try. The question of whether a try was properly grounded is often key to the referee's decision to award a try or not.

A player who is deemed "dirty" whether by fans or other players

H

 The haka is a traditional Māori dance performed by the Kiwis, the international rugby league team of New Zealand, immediately prior to international matches. It serves as a challenge to the opposing team. The term is often used more broadly (and often inaccurately) to refer to any war dance performed prior to a match (such as Samoa's Siva Tau).

 See Scrum-half.

 See Halves.

 A situation in which a ball-carrier is able to briefly get through the defensive line but is tackled before they can make a clean break.

 The halves, also known as half backs and sometimes inside backs, are the scrum-half (or halfback) and stand-off (or five-eighth) positions. They are named thus as in 19th century rugby football they were positioned at the midpoint between the forwards and the three full backs used during that time. Originally known as halfway backs in the 19th century, this was shortened in time.

 See Fend.

 "The surrendering of the ball to the opposition after a team has been tackled the statutory number of successive times." After the sixth tackle is completed the handover occurs. If the team in possession accidentally knocks on or passes forward after the fifth tackle a handover will occur rather than the usual scrum for these breaches; a handover also happens if a team kicks the ball into touch on the full after the fifth tackle.
 Before 1983, at the end of a set of tackles, a scrum had been formed with loose head and feed to the team that had been defending.

 Short for loose head and feed.

 Medical process carried out on players following any incident where concussion is suspected. Any player suffering a suspected concussion during a game is immediately removed from play and must undertake a head injury assessment (HIA). If the HIA is passed the player is free to return to the game. Failure of an HIA rules the player out from taking part in the rest of the game and the player must then follow the gradual return to play process. 

 The referee will call "held" to declare a tackle completed if the ball-carrier is held stationary by defenders.

 See Up and under See Up and under Another term for high tackle.

 A high tackle (or head-high tackle) is a form of tackle where the tackler grasps the ball carrier above the line of the shoulders (most commonly around the neck or at the line of the chin and jaw).
 Executed violently or at speed, a high tackle is potentially instantly lethal and, as extremely dangerous play, high tackles are a cause for penalties, and yellow or red cards.

 Australasian term for crash ball.

 In competitions under some authorities, the referee will tell the defensive line that it is too soon to advance on attackers at the play-the-ball by calling "Hold!". This call may be used by the referee as part of a sequence: "Move, hold, go".

 The hooker (numbered 9) is most likely to play the role of dummy-half. In defence the hooker usually defends in the middle of the line against the opposition's props and second-rowers. The hooker will be responsible for organising the defence in the middle of the field. In attack as dummy-half this player is responsible for starting the play from every play-the-ball by either passing the ball to the right player, or, at opportune moments, running from dummy-half. It is vital that the hooker can pass very well. Traditionally, hookers 'hooked' the ball in the scrum. Hookers also make probably more tackles than any other player on the field. The hooker is always involved in the play and needs to be very fit. He needs to have a very good knowledge of the game and the players around him.

I

 A running arc made by an attacking player. Often attempted by fast attacking players once the main line of defending players has been breached when they are left with the last player to beat. The ball-carrier arcs their run further in field, attempting to create indecision in the defender, before turning towards the corner and attempting to reach the goal line first to score a try.

 See: Halves Where a pass, in an attempt to find a member of the same team, is caught by a member of the opposing team.

 Each team may make a maximum of 12 interchanges from the 13 starting players and four substitutes. A player sent from the field by the referee because they are bleeding may be replaced but should this happen the replacement will count as one of that team's allotted interchanges. Props are the most commonly interchanged players due to their frequent physical confrontations with opponents. The number of interchanges allowed may differ in local competitions.

K

 See: Punt-out A coin is tossed and the winning captain either chooses which direction his team shall play, or elects to take the kick that starts the game. Both halves of the match are started with a kick off a tee from the centre-point of the halfway line. The kick must cross the opposition's 10-metre line, unless played by a member of the receiving team. The opposition are not allowed to encroach beyond the 10-metre line until the ball is kicked.
 If the ball does not travel 10 metres, goes straight into touch, or goes over the dead ball line at the end of the pitch, the opposing will be given a penalty at the centre.
 After a score, the game is restarted from the same place under the same restrictions, with the conceding team drop-kicking the ball to the scoring team.

 It is also called a knock-forward. A knock-on is committed when, in an attempt to play at the ball, a player knocks the ball towards their opponents' dead ball line with their hands or arms and it touches either the ground, or an opposing player. However, the ball may be knocked back. A knock-on results in a scrum with the put-in to the opposition apart from when a knock-on is committed by a player whose team is on their last tackle, when the result is a handover, and apart from if the opposing team gains possession of the ball, which results begins their set of tackles with a zero tackle.

L

 A late tackle is a tackle executed on a player who has already passed or kicked away the ball. As it is illegal to tackle a player who does not have the ball, Late tackles are penalty offences (referees allow a short margin of error where the tackler was already committed to the tackle) and if severe or reckless may result in yellow or red cards.
 If a late tackle occurs after a kick and a penalty is awarded, the non-offending team has the option of taking the penalty where the ball landed.

 When Team A's forward pack are on top of team B's pack and help give field position and time for the halves. 

 In Australia, a venue in which hospitality and gaming are operated for the benefit of a rugby league club, which they control through the appointment of board members. In the past, leagues clubs have provided funds to finance the operation of the sporting club, often due to profits made from poker machines. In the 2000s, political attacks over corporate governance led to tax changes that lessened profitability and meant clubs had to look at widening their revenue streams.

 Limited tackles were introduced in 1966, initially with a four-tackle rule. After using their tackles, the team in possession must surrender the ball to their opponents. The limit would remain four until an increase to six tackles in 1972 created the six-tackle rule.

 The speed of the defensive team in rushing forwards to meet the ball carrier from the tackle. Since the defensive side must retreat 10 metres after each tackle, a key aspect of defence is how much of this 10 metres they can recover before contact with the ball carrier.

 A referee may decide that an attacking player did not sufficiently protect their possession of the ball as they came into contact with defenders; this is termed a loose carry. This interpretation allows a referee to decide if they think the attacking player committed a knock-on or whether the defenders stripped the ball with intent. 

 The loose forward (numbered 13) is the only forward in the third (last) row of the scrum. They are usually one of the fittest players on the field, covering the entire field on both attacking and defending duties. Typically they are big ball-runners who can occasionally slot in as a passing link or kick option; it is not uncommon for loose forwards to have the skills of a five eighth and to play a similar role in the team.

 A team awarded a scrum due to a mistake by the opposing team is given the loose head and feed of that scrum. The "loose head" means that the prop closest to the player who feeds the scrum (puts the ball in) will be a team mate.
 In the era of fully contested scrums the loose head prop was able to exert influence on the outcome of the scrum by protecting the ball, moving the scrum etc.
 Before 1983, a scrum was formed at the end of a set of tackles, but in 1983 this was changed to a handover of possession.

M

 The mark is the place on the field where the referee awards a penalty kick, free kick or scrum.

 The defending team may position up to two of their players, known as "marker(s)" at the play-the-ball opposite the tackled player and the dummy-half from the attacking team.

 The attacking player - when in the ruck - will fall to the floor when touched by the defender looking to earn a penalty. If the referee is not conned he may shout "Milking!" to tell the attacker, 'get on with it'. 

 The so-called "momentum rule" is related to the Law on forward passes. Whether a ball has been illegally passed forward is judged by its movement relative to the player passing it. This method of judgement is used because most passes involve the ball moving forwards relative to the ground as the players carrying it are moving towards their opponents' goal line.

 The mulligrubber kick is a style of kicking. A mulligrubber is directed towards the ground and forced to bounce. Often used in situations where either the ball needs to be placed in a specific position (i.e. on the try line) or to intentionally stop the opponent from being able to catch the ball on the full.

O

 Impeding any opponent who does not have the ball by tackling them or obstructing them.RLIF, 2004: 23 The referee will penalise a player obstructing an opponent. A player is not required to move out of the path of another to prevent an obstruction. If two players from opposing teams are running in the same direction towards a loose ball they are permitted to shoulder charge their opponent.

 An offload is when a player holding the ball is tackled, but passes the ball to a team mate before the tackle is completed. (A tackle is not considered complete until one of the following occurs: the arm carrying the ball touches the ground while the player is still held by the tackler; the player's forward momentum stops - in other words, he stops moving forward - while still being held by the tackler; or the referee calls "held".) If a player passes the ball legally during a tackle - in other words, if he offloads the ball - it does not count as a tackle in his team's current set of six, and play continues normally. Dual rugby/league international Sonny Bill Williams is particularly famous for his offloading ability.

 When the dummy half passes to the first receiver who will take the ball into collision to gain metres. No passing beyond the initial play of the ball and pass from dummy-half occurs.

 A player is onside whenever he or she is behind the relevant offside line for the particular phase of play. Players who are onside take an active part in playing the game.
 Previously offside players may be "put onside" by the actions of other players (for example, in a kick ahead in open play, players in the kicker's team in front of the kick are offside but can be put onside by the kicker or any other team member who was onside at the time of the kick running up the pitch past them). So that players can be confident they are now onside and can take an active part in the game, the referee may shout "Onside" or "All onside".

 If the ball is kicked into touch without first bouncing inside the field of play it is referred to as the ball being kicked into touch on the full.
 A player catching the ball after a kick before it bounces has caught it on the full.

 The broad side of the pitch in relation to a scrum or a play-the-ball.

 The optional kick is the instrument used to bring the ball back into play.RLIF, 2004: 18 The team taking the kick may kick the ball in any way and in any direction. Except in cases of a penalty kick being taken, an optional kick is taken from the centre of the 20m line if the attacking team are the last to touch the ball before it goes over the dead ball line or touch in-goal line.  An optional kick will also be awarded if an "attacking player infringes in the in-goal area" or if a defending player catches a kick in general play on the full while in their in-goal.

 See: ThreequartersP

 Refers to the group of forwards of a team.

 To form a scrum.

 A set-piece move with numerous variations in which attacking players stand side-by-side facing their own goal line while they and their teammates attempt to obscure the ball and confuse the defenders of the opposing team. The move is named after the Parramatta Eels.

 A pass is to transfer a ball to a teammate by throwing it. Passes must not travel forward in direction from the hands of the person passing. There are different varieties of pass, including the flat, direct spin pass; the short, close-quarters pop pass; and the floated pass - a long pass which an advancing player can run onto at pace.

 If a side commits a penalty infringement the opposition can take the option of a place kick at goal from where the infringement occurred. This is called a penalty kick. If successful, it is worth two points.

 Placers are used to hold the ball in-place for a kicker during a place kick attempt. Placers are usually only used in the modern game if weather conditions are causing the ball to move from the position it has been set in by the kicker. In the early years of the game, when defenders could charge the ball as soon as it touched the ground, a placer was permitted to be used to place the ball on the ground at the last moment.

 The props (numbered 8 and 10) are normally the largest players on field (they typically weigh over 15 stones (100kg) in the open age/senior game). They are positioned in the centre of the line. The prop is an 'enforcer', dissuading the opposition from attacking the centre of the defensive line and in attack give the team momentum by taking the ball up to the defence aggressively.

 Between 1897 and 1902, the punt-out, also called a kick-in, was an option for the method of restarting play after the ball had gone into touch (the other option being a scrum). It replaced the line-out in 1897 and was itself replaced by a scrum on the 10 yard line in 1902. A punt-out was taken from the touch-line by a player who could kick the ball back into play, in any direction.

 See Feeding the scrumR

 The area between each goal line and their respective 20 metre lines, i.e. their own quarter, may be referred to as the "red zone".

 The decision over awarding a possible try having been referred to the video referee for examination may be passed back to the referee on the pitch to make the decision if the video is inconclusive. This rule is not used in the Northern Hemisphere.

 Someone who has great knowledge about the sport of Rugby League.

 The ruck is located between the player playing-the-ball and the defending marker. The ruck exists during the time between a tackle being completed and the subsequent play-the-ball being completed. The ball cannot be interfered with by the marker whilst it is in the ruck, otherwise a penalty will be issued against that player's team. A penalty is also issued against the attacking team if the player responsible for playing-the-ball, does not play it correctly.

S

 The state of the defence following a break, with players retreating in order to try to make a cover tackle or to get back onside if the attacker has already been tackled.

 A move involving a decoy runner.

 Second-year syndrome, also called second-season syndrome, is where young players who, having had a successful début season, struggle in their second season. A commonly cited cause is a failure to develop playing ability further in an era of video analysis by rival teams.

 Awarded to a team when the opposition kick the ball dead in goal. The opposition get the ball back and start their set on the 20 metre line while gaining an extra tackle meaning they have seven tackles instead of the standard six. 

 An attempt to cause a disruption and breach in the defence of the opposing team. The attacking player carrying the ball forward will veer at an angle to their left or right, often drawing with them the defender covering them and sometimes engaging another defender by running towards them. A team mate of the ball carrier will run across and forward in the other direction just behind the ball carrier, receiving a pass as they cross and then running on towards the point of the disruption in the defence. Also known as a switch.

 

 The scrum half or 'half back' (numbered 7) is the player who directs the game and is usually one of the smaller players on the pitch. The scrum half, along with the stand off, together form the "creative unit" of the team. They will control the attack, deciding with their passes how the team attacks and if, when and where the ball is kicked. This player is also responsible for making sure all the other players are in the right position for an attacking move.

 An attempt by a defending player who has made a tackle on an attacker to delay the play-the-ball by interfering with the tackled player's attempt to regain their feet. The referee will penalise the attempt if seen.

 The second row forwards (numbered 11 and 12) The modern day second row is very similar to a centre and is expected to be faster, more mobile and have more skills than the prop and will play amongst the three-quarters, providing strength in attack and defence when the ball is passed out to the wings. Good second-rowers combine the skills and responsibilities of props and centres in the course of the game.

 A phrase sometimes used in commentary to refer to a hand-off or fend.

 Refers to the positioning of players. Most often used when talking about the positioning of attacking players when they are supporting the ball-carrier after a break. "Good shape" will usually mean the support players have succeeded in positioning themselves to either side of the player running with the ball to offer offensive passing options.

 The side of the play-the-ball which has the shorter distance to the touch line.

 A term used to praise a big hit on an opposing player. "Shot" can be heard by commentators when they witness a big, dominant tackle. It's a seal of approval. 

 The show: the player in possession of the ball will attack the defensive line with a stance and holding the ball in front of them in a way so as to create the impression that a pass to a team mate is likely to occur. The defenders may be unwilling to commit themselves to tackling the ball-carrier as to do so would could create an exploitable gap in the line should a pass be made.
 The go: with indecision created in the defence, the ball carrier will sprint for a weak point in the defensive line.

 An attempt to evade defenders by the attacking player carrying the ball. By stepping to the side, the attacking player is testing the reactions of defenders and hoping gain time and space to advance the ball.

 The six-tackle rule was introduced in 1972, modifying the rules on limited tackles, to alleviate the "disjointed" play experienced with the four-tackle rule.

 The sliding defence requires that gaps are left at either edge of the field at the end of the defensive line, which aims to squeeze more players around the area of play. This allows the line to be at its strongest around the position of play, thus leaving the attacking side less opportunity to run through the line. Should the attacking side move the ball towards one edge of the field in an attempt to go around the defensive line, then the entire defensive line will move in that direction; this is known as sliding.

 The stand off, or "five-eighth", (numbered 6) is one of the most skilful players in a team, often a playmaker and likely to be a tactical kicker for the team. The stand-off will have a high level of interaction with the other playmaker positions (scrum-half, loose forward and hooker), and will usually be involved in most passing moves.

 The act of defending players removing the ball from the possession of the attacking player. This is allowed if there is only one defender in contact with the attacker (see one-on-one tackle).

 As well as the 13 players on the playing field, each team selects up to four substitutes to be available as replacements in interchanges during the game.

 "Summer era" and "Super League era" are virtually synonymous terms in British rugby league for the period of time since the 1996 change to the top level of competition in the United Kingdom from being the Rugby Football League Championship, which was played to a schedule that included the winter months of November, December and January, to being Super League and played in the summer months.

 Rugby league in the northern hemisphere, led by Britain, has gravitated increasingly towards playing in the summer rather than in the traditional winter seasons. The initial change was made by the top level of competition in the United Kingdom when Super League I launched in 1996 and played through the summer. Since then the other professional tiers, as well as amateur competitions such as the Rugby League Conference, and some junior leagues have changed or been formed to play in summer. Benefits have included fewer postponed matches and a more enjoyable experience for players and spectators.

 Players in support are putting themselves in a position to be able to assist a team mate. Effective support play is considered vital to quickly take advantage of opportunities to make ground towards the opponents' end of the field or to score.

 A referee may call "Surrender!" as a player is tackled to indicate that they have judged the player in possession to have allowed themselves to be tackled by diving to the ground or by collapsing in the tackle. The referee will allow the defending team more time to release the tackled player. The intention of the player in possession is to gain an unfair advantage by having a speedy play-the-ball and resumption of play so that their team can press their advantage by reducing the amount of time available for the defending team to organise their defence. The player in possession aims to allowing the tackle to be completed on their own terms, for example their body position, letting them more easily regain their feet.

 Defending players may be penalised by the referee if they are caught using a swinging arm against the ball-carrier in the tackle.

T

{{defn|1=
The player in possession may be tackled by players on the opposing team. It is not permitted to tackle or obstruct a player not in possession of the ball.

A tackle is completed when the player in possession of the ball:
 Is held by a defending player while the ball or ball-carrying arm are in contact with the ground.
 Is held by a defending player in such a way that they cannot make "further progress" and "cannot part with the ball".
 While being held by a defending player, makes it clear that they have "succumbed to the tackle and wish to be released in order to play the ball".
}}

 Another term for Ankle tap.

 The threequarters, also known as "outside backs", consist of the wingers and centres. The term "threequarters" originated as the tactics and player formations of rugby football developed in the 1880s. The players positioned between the halves and the full back were known as the quarters; during the years in which it was usual for there to be three players positioned here, they were known collectively as the three quarters. Later, the addition of a fourth player to the quarters became usual for teams. As the formations developed, an additional player was placed between the halfback and the quarters. Due to a semantic change for three quarters to mean 6/8ths, with halfback being 4/8ths, the position came to be known as the five-eighth.

 The part of the touch line that is inside the in-goal area. If a team causes the ball to go into touch in-goal in their own in-goal area they must perform a goal line drop-out. If a team causes the ball to go into touch in-goal in the opposing team's in-goal, the opposing team will be given an optional kick on the 20 metre line.

 Otherwise known as the goal line, so-called because a player has to cross this line to score a try.

 Another term for handover.

U

 The umbrella defence (or "up and in defence") requires that players do not spread across the entire field. The defensive line is particularly vulnerable on the edges around the wings, therefore the best defensive measure in this case is a preventive measure. That is, the aim becomes to prevent the attacking team from going to the wings or to disrupt any passes towards the edge of the field. This requires that defensive players (wingers or centres) on the edge of the defensive line move up faster than those in the middle of the line.

 See: Umbrella defence

 A style of play intended to reduce the chance of attacking players committing errors. This is usually accomplished by limiting passes in number and risk. Often advocated for use by a team in the lead late in the match.

V

 The attacking player in possession is not allowed to "deliberately and unnecessarily" allow themselves to be tackled by falling to the ground when not held by a defender. This includes times when a player has fallen on a loose ball, in these instances the player must attempt to regain their feet and continue. Section 11, Law 4 of the Laws of the Game deems the voluntary tackle illegal.

W

 The wings or "wing three quarters" (numbered 2 and 5) are normally the fastest players in a team and play on the far left and right fringes of the field (the wings). Their main task is to receive passes and score tries. The wingers also drop back on the last tackle to cover the left and right sides of the field for kicks while the full back covers the middle.

Z

 Zam-Buk, or zambuk, was a skin-dressing sold in chemists and used by ambulance-men and first aiders at rugby league matches on injured players from the 1900s. In Australia and New Zealand the term was soon being used to refer to the ambulance-men and first aiders themselves. The term fell into disuse in the 1970s as ambulance-men and first aiders were replaced by club trainers and others.

References

In-line

General

 
 
 

 
Terms
Rugby league terms
Wikipedia glossaries using description lists